Sir George Philips, 1st Baronet (24 March 1766 – 3 October 1847) was an English textile industrialist and politician. He was closely associated with Manchesterism and has been described as the "unofficial member for Manchester", though not formally representing it.

Biography 
Philips came from an old Staffordshire family that had held manors there since the reign of Edward VI of England, and were seated at Heath House in the same county since the early seventeenth century, that continued to be lived in by his cousins. George's father, Thomas Philips (1728–1811) of Sedgley, Lancashire, established a cotton manufacturing company in Manchester.

George attended several schools, including Stand Grammar School. He was brought up in the dissenting tradition. Towards the end of the eighteenth century he joined forces with Samuel Boddington and "Conversation" Sharp (alias Richard Sharp) to form the West India company of 'Boddington, Sharp and Philips' which was based at 15 Mark Lane, London.

As fellow Dissenters, the three partners shared many common interests. Philips enjoyed writing poetry and he was especially pleased with his Epistle from Windemere to Richd. Sharp Esq., which was proudly shown to such friends as James Mackintosh, Samuel Rogers, and William Wordsworth.
Boddington and Philips followed Sharp's example by becoming dissenting Whig Members of Parliament and in time Philips gained a reputation for his fine oratory, speaking in the House on several occasions in opposition to regulating child labour in the cotton mills.

In Parliament he sat as a Whig and represented Ilchester 1812, Steyning 1818–1820, Wootton Bassett 1820–30.  Philips was an MP for Warwickshire South  following the Reform Act until 1835.

He is pictured in a commemorative painting by Sir George Hayter of the 1833 parliament.

Weston House
As his wealth grew (Sydney Smith teasingly nicknamed him "King Cotton"), Philips left the family home in Manchester, Sedgley Hall, and built Weston House in Warwickshire. It was the work of James Trubshaw to the design of Edward Blore, constructed from 1826 to 1833, and was fitted out by Augustus Pugin. The building was demolished in 1932.

Works
Under the influence of Thomas Cooper, Philips wrote a pamphlet The Necessity of a Speedy and Effectual Reform in Parliament, published 28 January 1793. It included advocacy of votes for women, and was criticised. Philips then retracted it.

Family
Philips married Sarah-Ann, eldest daughter of Nathaniel Philips of Hollinghurst. They had one son, George Richard.

See also 
J. & N. Philips

References

External links 
 

1766 births
1847 deaths
West Indies merchants
Members of the Parliament of the United Kingdom for English constituencies
UK MPs 1818–1820
UK MPs 1820–1826
UK MPs 1826–1830
UK MPs 1832–1835
Baronets in the Baronetage of the United Kingdom
Whig (British political party) MPs for English constituencies
People educated at Stand Grammar School
Committee members of the Society for the Diffusion of Useful Knowledge